Minister of Energy and Water of Angola is a cabinet level position in the national government. The position was established in 1975 with Ambrósio Lukoki.

Name changes
 1975–1983: Minister of Energy
 1984–1991: Minister of Energy and Petroleum
 1991–1997: Secretary of State for Energy and Water
 1997–present: Minister of Energy and Water

Ministers of Energy and Water
 1980–1989: Pedro de Castro Van Dúnem
 1989–1991: Zeferino Cassa Yombo
 1991–1991: João Lourenço Landoite
 1991–1992: Joaquim Quelhas Mesquita Mota
 1992–2002: João Moreira Pinto Saraiva
 2002–2009: José Maria Botelho de Vasconcelos
 2009–2011: Emmanuela Bernardeth Afonso Vieira Lopes
 2011–present: João Baptista Borges

References

External links

 http://www.minea.gov.ao/

Energy and Water
Energy and Water Ministers
Politics of Angola